There are Scrabble competitions for students and the public in Hong Kong.

National Association
In July 2015, Hong Kong Student Scrabble Players Association (HKSSPA) announced that it has been accepted as a member association of World English-Language Scrabble Players Association (WESPA), becoming Hong Kong's national association for Scrabble.

In November 2015, HKSSPA changed its name to Hong Kong Scrabble Players Association (HKSPA).

Competitions

Inter-School Scrabble Championship
In Hong Kong, Mattel and Broadlearning organize the Inter-School Scrabble Championship  for primary schools and secondary schools' students every year starting from 2003. However, the championship was not held in 2011 and 2014.

In 2015, Hong Kong Student Scrabble Players Association (HKSSPA) organises the Inter-School Scrabble Championship 2015, including Primary and Secondary Category.

HKSPA continues to organise the Inter-School Scrabble Championship in 2016 with 4 categories, namely Primary (Novice), Secondary (Novice), Primary (Open) and Secondary (Open).

In 2017, HKSPA cooperated with the Headstart Group to organise the Secondary Category of the Championship, which was called "Headstart Cup" Hong Kong Inter-Secondary School Scrabble Championship. HKSPA continued to organise the Primary Category of the Championship.

Winners by number of times

Secondary Category: Ho Lap College (Sponsored by the Sik Sik Yuen) (10), St. Mark's School (2), CCC Mong Man Wai College (1), Methodist College (1)

Primary Category: S.K.H. St. Michael's Primary School (8), Pui Ching Primary School (2), Lok Wah Catholic Primary School (1), Ng Wah Catholic Primary School (1)

World Youth Scrabble Championship Hong Kong Qualifier
Hong Kong sent its first-ever Hong Kong Youth Scrabble Team to the World Youth Scrabble Championship 2015 in Perth, Australia. A qualifier is held every year to select the Hong Kong Team members.

Invitational Scrabble Competitions
Some schools, which are active in the field of Scrabble, also organize invitational Scrabble competitions every year. The 1st notable invitational Scrabble competition was held in 2005, by Shun Tak Fraternal Association Leung Kau Kui College. Notable invitational Scrabble competitions include St. Michael's Invitational Scrabble Championship, Ho Lap College Invitational Scrabble Championship, CCC Mong Man Wai College Inter-School Scrabble Tournament, and Shun Tak Fraternal Association Leung Kau Kui College Inter-School Invitational Scrabble Tournament.

Some schools also organize district-based Scrabble competition. HKMA K S Lo College organizes the K S Lo Inter-school Scrabble Championship for Tin Shui Wai primary schools starting from 2012. SKH Tsang Shiu Tim Secondary School organized the Invitational Scrabble Competition for Shatin secondary schools in 2014 and 2015.

St. Michael's Invitational Scrabble Championship, Ho Lap College Invitational Scrabble Championship and CCC Mong Man Wai College Inter-School Scrabble Tournament share similar rules in the tournament, with individuals as the basis of the tournament.

Scrabble clubs and teams

School-based scrabble clubs and teams
Notable school-based Scrabble Clubs and Teams include the SKHTST Scrabble Team, SKH St. Michael's Primary School Scrabble Club, South Tuen Mun Government Secondary School Scrabble Team and HKMA K S Lo College Scrabble Team.

References

External links
Skhsms.edu.hk
Skhsms.edu.hk

Hong Kong
Education in Hong Kong
Scrabble competitions